Căldărești River may refer to the following rivers in Romania:

 Căldărești, a tributary of the Crișul Negru in Arad County
 Căldărești, a tributary of the Slănic in Buzău County

See also 
 Căldăraru (disambiguation)
 Căldărușa (disambiguation)